Karen Burton (born June 11, 1962) is an American former competition swimmer who specialized in long-distance freestyle and open water events.  She represented the United States at the 1991 and 1998 World Aquatics Championships in Perth, Western Australia, competing in the 25-kilometer open-water event.  She finished third in 1991, earning a bronze medal.

She holds a bachelor's degree in Human Factor Engineering.

References
USA Swimming

1962 births
Living people
American female freestyle swimmers
American long-distance swimmers
People from Eagle River, Wisconsin
United States Air Force Academy alumni
Women in the United States Air Force
World Aquatics Championships medalists in open water swimming
21st-century American women
Military personnel from Wisconsin